Rebound is a 1931 American Pre-Code drama film starring Ina Claire, Robert Ames and Myrna Loy. Directed by Edward H. Griffith, the film is based on the play of the same name by Donald Ogden Stewart.

Cast
 Ina Claire as Sara Jaffrey
 Robert Ames as Bill Truesdale
 Myrna Loy as Evie Lawrence
 Hedda Hopper as Liz Crawford
 Robert Williams as Johnnie Coles
 Louise Closser Hale as Mrs. Jaffrey
 Walter Walker as Mr. Henry Jaffrey
 Hale Hamilton as Lyman Patterson
 Leigh Allen as Les Crawford
 Pierre D'Ennery as Gaston

(cast list as per American Film Institute database.)

Reception
According to RKO records, the film recorded a loss of $215,000.

References

External links
 
 
 
 

1931 drama films
1931 films
American drama films
American black-and-white films
1930s English-language films
American films based on plays
Films directed by Edward H. Griffith
1930s French-language films
Films scored by Arthur Lange
RKO Pictures films
Pathé Exchange films
1931 multilingual films
American multilingual films
1930s American films